Samuel Parker Dickson (May 21, 1887 – May 30, 1911) was a race car riding mechanic, and the first person to be killed in the Indianapolis 500.

Biography
Sam Dickson was born in Chicago on May 21, 1887, the son of writer Maxwell E. Dickson and Martha E. Dickson.

He was buried at Rosehill Cemetery.

Indianapolis 500
In the inaugural race, Dickson was the riding mechanic for Arthur Greiner, who was making his only 500 appearance. On lap twelve, one of the front wheels came off of the American Simplex car Greiner was driving, causing Greiner to lose control and both men to be thrown from the car. Dickson flew into a fence twenty feet from the car. Reports state that Dickson was killed instantly, although the crowd evidently swarmed around the body, requiring the state militia who were acting as security at the event to use their guns as clubs to clear a path for the attending doctors.

References

Disasters in Indiana
Sports deaths in Indiana
Indianapolis 500
1887 births
1911 deaths
Burials at Rosehill Cemetery